The following outline is provided as an overview of and topical guide to thought (thinking):

Thought (also called thinking) is the mental process in which beings form psychological associations and models of the world.  Thinking is manipulating information, as when we form concepts, engage in problem solving, reason and make decisions.  Thought, the act of thinking, produces more thoughts.  A thought may be an idea, an image, a sound or even control an emotional feeling.

Nature of thought 
Thought (or thinking) can be described as all of the following:

 An activity taking place in a:
 brain – organ that serves as the center of the nervous system in all vertebrate and most invertebrate animals (only a few invertebrates such as sponges, jellyfish, adult sea squirts and starfish do not have a brain). It is the physical structure associated with the mind.
 mind – abstract entity with the cognitive faculties of consciousness, perception, thinking, judgement, and memory. Having a mind is a characteristic of living creatures. Activities taking place in a mind are called mental processes or cognitive functions.
Since a sequence of operations (an algorithm) can be readily changed, the computer can solve more than one kind of problem.
Through intelligence, living creatures possess the cognitive abilities to learn, form concepts, understand, apply logic, and reason, including the capacities to recognize patterns, comprehend ideas, plan, problem solve, make decisions, retaining, and use language to communicate. Intelligence enables living creatures to experience and think.
 A type of mental process – something that individuals can do with their minds. Mental processes include perception, memory, thinking, volition, and emotion. Sometimes the term cognitive function is used instead.
 A biological adaptation mechanism
 Neural Network explanation: Thoughts are created by the summation of neural outputs and connections of which vectors form. These vectors describe the magnitude and direction of the connections and action between neurons. The graphs of these vectors can represent a network of neurons whose connections fire in different ways over time as synapses fire.  These large thought vectors in the brain cause other vectors of activity.  For example: An input from the environment is received by the neural network.  The network changes the magnitude and outputs of individual neurons.  The altered network outputs the symbols needed to make sense of the input.

Types of thoughts

Content of thoughts

Types of thought (thinking) 
Listed below are types of thought, also known as thinking processes.

Animal thought

Human thought

Classifications of thought

Creative processes

Decision-making

Erroneous thinking

Emotional intelligence (emotionally based thinking)

Problem solving

Reasoning

Machine thought

Organizational thought 
Organizational thought (thinking by organizations)

 
 
 Organizational planning

Aspects of the thinker 
Aspects of the thinker which may affect (help or hamper) his or her thinking:

Properties of thought

Fields that study thought

Thought tools and thought research

History of thinking

Nootropics (cognitive enhancers and smart drugs) 

Substances that improve mental performance:

Organizational thinking concepts

Teaching methods and skills

Awards related to thinking

Awards for acts of genius

Organizations 
 Associations pertaining to thought
 
 
 
 
 
 
 s
 
 s

Media

Publications

Books 
 Handbook of Automated Reasoning

Periodicals 
 Journal of Automated Reasoning
 Journal of Formalized Reasoning
 Positive Thinking Magazine

Television programs 
 Thinkabout (U.S. TV series)

Persons associated with thinking

People notable for their extraordinary ability to think 
 Geniuses
 List of Nobel laureates (see also Nobel Prize)
 Polymaths

Scientists in fields that study thought 
 List of cognitive scientists

Scholars of thinking 
 Aaron T. Beck
 Edward de Bono
 David D. Burns – author of Feeling Good: The New Mood Therapy and The Feeling Good Handbook. Burns popularized Aaron T. Beck's cognitive behavioral therapy (CBT) when his book became a best seller during the 1980s.
 Tony Buzan
 Noam Chomsky
 Albert Ellis
 Howard Gardner
 Eliyahu M. Goldratt
 Douglas Hofstadter
 Ray Kurzweil
 Marvin Minsky
 Steven Pinker
 Baruch Spinoza
 Robert Sternberg

Related concepts 
 Cognition
 Knowledge
 Multiple intelligences
 Strategy
 Structure
 System

Awareness and perception

Learning and memory

See also 

 Artificial intelligence
 Outline of artificial intelligence
 Human intelligence
 Outline of human intelligence
 Neuroscience
 Outline of neuroscience
 Psychology
 Gestalt psychology (theory of mind)
 Outline of psychology

Miscellaneous

Thinking 

Lists

References

External links 

 The Psychology of Emotions, Feelings and Thoughts, Free Online Book

.
Cognitive science lists
.
Thought
Thought